Sanderstead railway station is on the Oxted Line in the London Borough of Croydon,  from Sanderstead village. The station is managed by Southern.

On the up (London-bound) platform is a ticket office, staffed for most of the day, and a self-service ticket machine is outside the station on the up side: there is no PERTIS (Permit to travel) machine. Purley Oaks, also in Travelcard Zone 6, is nearby.

History 

The station was opened on 10 March 1884 by the London, Brighton and South Coast Railway and the South Eastern Railway with their line between South Croydon and East Grinstead. The population was around 300, rising to 534 by 1901.

In 1913 the station was set alight in an act of arson. The suffragette Elsie Duval was the main suspect. The replacement building was weather-boarded, cheap to construct but requiring regular maintenance. An extensive bookstall was on the up platform, and a signal box on the down platform.

On it would have run a loop service from Charing Cross to Lewisham and then Woodside-Sanderstead-Orpington and back, or vice versa. However, the scheme could not attract investment and was moribund even before electrification of the Woodside and South Croydon Joint Railway as its first stage. This was from Woodside to Selsdon and over a short section of the Oxted Line to Sanderstead, and was completed in 1935. This route terminating at Sanderstead involved the only electric train service at the station until 1984.

These electric trains, on the Woodside and South Croydon Railway via Selsdon to Elmers End, ran from 1935 until the line closed in 1983; at that time, fewer than 150 people were using the service per day, which operated only on weekdays at peak hours to Elmers End.

Electrification of the South Croydon-Selsdon and Sanderstead-East Grinstead sections of the Oxted Line was approved by BR in the early 1980s: South Croydon-Selsdon was electrified in 1984 using some redundant materials from the closed Woodside-Selsdon line, and a London Bridge to Sanderstead electric train service begun.

The station building was destroyed by fire again in June 1986, and a new brick building opened in September 1987. The signal box closed on 2 November 1985, and was demolished in August 1987.

Electrification to East Grinstead was completed in October 1987.

Services 
Off-peak, all services at Sanderstead are operated by Southern using  EMUs.

The typical off-peak service in trains per hour is:
 1 tph to 
 1 tph to  via 

During the peak hours and on weekends, the service is increased to 2 tph in each direction.

These services are operated using  EMUs.

Facilities 
The station is staffed until five minutes after the last train. There is a small tea bar at one end of the station which has recently been re-opened during morning peak hours. There is a footbridge between the platforms. The station has been selling second hand books for charity since 2009 and a certificate on display shows how much has been raised. A children's table and chairs have recently been installed.

Connections
London Buses route 403 serves the station.

References

External links 

Railway stations in the London Borough of Croydon
Former Croydon and Oxted Joint Railway stations
Railway stations in Great Britain opened in 1884
Railway stations served by Govia Thameslink Railway